{{DISPLAYTITLE:C10H12N4O3}}
The molecular formula C10H12N4O3 (molar mass: 236.23 g/mol, exact mass: 236.0909 u) may refer to:

 Carbazochrome
 Didanosine